Hässelby Athletic Sports Club is a Swedish sports club located in Hässelby within the city of Stockholm. Founded in 1913, the departments it operates include the sports football, athletics and floorball. Their football club, Hässelby SK FF, is affiliated with Stockholms Fotbollförbund within the Swedish Football Association. The club used to have a department for bandy too.

Hässelby SK has had a pivotal role in the establishment of a number of running events, such as the Stockholm Marathon, XL Galan and the Tjejmilen.

Notable athletes
Angelica Bengtsson
Isabellah Andersson
Jessica Samuelsson
Mattias Claesson
Yussuf Saleh
Johan Wissman
Mattias Jons

References

External links
 Official website
 Football website
 Floorball website

Association football clubs established in 1913
Bandy clubs established in 1913
Football clubs in Stockholm
Defunct bandy clubs in Sweden
Sport in Stockholm
1913 establishments in Sweden